The 1919 Morningside Maroons football team was an American football that represented Morningside College during the 1919 college football season. In its eighth season under head coach Jason M. Saunderson, the team compiled a 5–2 record.

Schedule

References

Morningside
Morningside Mustangs football seasons
Morningside Maroons football